Maureen Giles (born 27 January 1938) is an Australian former swimmer. She competed in the women's 100 metre butterfly at the 1956 Summer Olympics. She married John Monckton, an Australian swimmer who also competed at the 1956 Olympics.

References

External links
 

1938 births
Living people
Olympic swimmers of Australia
Swimmers at the 1956 Summer Olympics
Place of birth missing (living people)
Australian female butterfly swimmers
20th-century Australian women